Robert Vincent (died 1765) was an Anglican priest who served as the second minister of St. John's Anglican Church, Lunenburg, Nova Scotia (1761–1765).  He was also the school master of Lunenburg. He was buried in the Old Burying Ground in Halifax, Nova Scotia.

References 

1765 deaths
History of Nova Scotia
Year of birth unknown